Herman Hoogland (October 31, 1891 in Utrecht- November 25, 1955 in Utrecht) was the first draughts (also known as "checkers") world-champion from the Netherlands. He dominated the game for over a decade and became a leading student of it. He began playing the game seriously in 1908 at age seventeen. In 1912 he became world champion for the first time. From 1923 onward he became an advocate for a different way of playing the game.

External links
Checkers world records site
Pictured in second column, fourth row

1891 births
1955 deaths
Dutch draughts players
Players of international draughts
Sportspeople from Utrecht (city)